Rimma Vasilievna Markova (3 March 1925 – 15 January 2015) was a Russian film actress. She was named a People's Artist of Russia in 1994, whereas her younger brother Leonid Markov was named a People's Artist of the USSR in 1985.

During her childhood from 1931 through 1934, Markova played minor roles in Saratov Dramatic Theatre, where her father was working. In 1945–1947, Rimma Markova studied at the school affiliated with the Vologda Dramatic Theatre with her brother Leonid. She appeared in small but memorable parts in numerous Soviet films.

Markova's public profile increased in the early 21st century. She began appearing regularly on Russian TV shows and campaigned enthusiastically for the Fair Russia political party during the 2011 legislative elections.

The party's candidate for the 2012 presidential election, Sergei Mironov, asked Markova to run his campaign. "Her popularity across the country is a part of mythology", he told the Moscow Times.

Selected ilmography
 The Life and Adventures of Mishka Yaponchik (Жизнь и приключения Мишки Япончика, 2011) as Pani Basia
 Burnt by the Sun 2 (Утомлённые солнцем 2, 2011) as nurse
 The Best Movie (Самый лучший фильм, 2008) as mistress of prostitutes
 Day Watch (Дневной дозор, 2006) as witch Daria Schultz
 Night Watch (Ночной дозор, 2004) as witch Daria Schultz
 Okraina (Окраина, 1998) as Morozov's mother
 Gardemarines ahead! (Гардемарины, вперёд!, 1988) as Holy mother Leonidia
 The Pokrovsky Gate (Покровские ворота, 1982) as doctor
 Family Relations (Родня, 1981) as receptionist at the hotel
 Sweet Woman (Сладкая женщина, 1977) as Anna's mother
 Eternal Call (Вечный зов, 1973–83) as Vasilisa
Woman's World (Бабье царство, 1967) as Nadezhda Petrovna
Wings (Крылья, 1966) as Shura
The Alive and the Dead (Живые и мёртвые, 1964) as episode (uncredited)

References

External links

1925 births
2015 deaths
Recipients of the Order of Honour (Russia)
People's Artists of Russia
Russian film actresses
Soviet film actresses
A Just Russia politicians
21st-century Russian politicians
Actors from Samara, Russia